Gold Canyon is a census-designated place (CDP) and unincorporated community in Pinal County, Arizona, United States. The community is sometimes incorrectly called Gold Camp.

The town name is referred to as Gold Camp on weather statements issued by the National Weather Service (as seen in citation). The closest city to Gold Canyon is Apache Junction, Arizona.

Geography
Gold Canyon is located at  (33.361913, -111.451629).

According to the United States Census Bureau, the CDP has a total area of 22.3 square miles (57.8 km), all  land.

Gold Canyon is located on U.S. Route 60.

Peralta Regional Park, a Regional Park, is located in Gold Canyon, east of Peralta Road. The park is 498 acres in area. The park was opened at 10:00 a.m. on January 11.

Demographics

At the 2000 census there were 6,029 people, 2,785 households, and 2,211 families in the CDP. (In 2007, the population was recounted and was declared 10,064.) The racial makup of the CDP was 96.2% White, 0.3% Black or African American, 0.7% Native American, 0.5% Asian, 0.1% Pacific Islander, 1.4% from other races, and 0.9% from two or more races.  3.5%. were Hispanic or Latino of any race.

Of the 2,785 households 13.0% had children under the age of 18 living with them, 73.8% were married couples living together, 3.5% had a female householder with no husband present, and 20.6% were non-families. 16.1% of households were one person and 6.4% were one person aged 65 or older.  The average household size was 2.16 and the average family size was 2.38.

The age distribution was 12.4% under the age of 18, 3.0% from 18 to 24, 17.8% from 25 to 44, 37.0% from 45 to 64, and 29.8% 65 or older.  The median age was 56 years. For every 100 females, there were 95.9 males.  For every 100 females age 18 and over, there were 95.5 males.

The median household income was $57,705 and the median family income  was $60,438. Males had a median income of $47,727 versus $31,583 for females. The per capita income for the CDP was $35,010.  About 2.8% of families and 3.8% of the population were below the poverty line, including 10.6% of those under age 18 and 2.4% of those age 65 or over.

Local media
On August 7, 2014, Gold Canyon Public Radio (KRWV-LP 99.3) "The Wave" began broadcasting as a low-power station for the area.

Attractions
Gold Canyon is the closest community to the Arizona Renaissance Festival.
Gold Canyon is also home to the Gold Canyon Arts Festival.

References

External links
Local Weather Conditions
Gold Canyon Website
Gold Canyon Communities
Gold Canyon Public Radio

Census-designated places in Pinal County, Arizona
Phoenix metropolitan area